William Hume-Rothery OBE FRS (15 May 1899 – 27 September 1968) was an English metallurgist and materials scientist who studied the constitution of alloys.

Early life and education 
Hume-Rothery was born the son of lawyer Joseph Hume-Rothery in Worcester Park, Surrey. His grandfather, William Rothery, was a clergyman. His campaigning grandmother, Mary Hume-Rothery, was the daughter of Joseph Hume, a Scottish doctor and Radical Member of parliament. William spent his youth in Cheltenham and was educated at Cheltenham College. In 1917 he was made totally deaf by a virus infection. Nevertheless, he entered Magdalen College, Oxford, and obtained a first class Honours degree in chemistry.  He also attended the Royal School of Mines and was awarded a PhD.

Career
During World War II, he supervised numerous government contracts for work on aluminium and magnesium alloys.

After the war he returned to Oxford "to carry on research in intermetallic compounds and problems on the borderland of metallography and chemistry" and remained there for the rest of his working life. In 1938 he was appointed lecturer in metallurgical chemistry. In his research, he concluded that the microstructure of an alloy depends on the sizes of the component atoms, as well as the valency electron concentration, and electrochemical differences. This led to the definition of the Hume-Rothery rules.

In the 1950s he founded the Department of Metallurgy (which is now the Department of Materials) at the University of Oxford, and was a fellow of St Edmund Hall, Oxford.
He was also involved in founding the Journal of the Less-Common Metals, which developed out of an international symposium on metals and alloys above 1200 °C that he organised at Oxford University on 17–18 September 1958. The papers presented at the symposium "The study of metals and alloys above 1200°C" were published as Volume 1 of the Journal of the Less-Common Metals.

He was a member of the Oxford Philatelic Society.

William Hume-Rothery Award
The William Hume-Rothery Award has since 1974 been awarded annually by The Minerals, Metals & Materials Society.

Honours and awards
Hume-Rothery was elected a Fellow of the Royal Society in May, 1937
Awarded the Francis J. Clamer Medal in 1949.

Personal life and retirement
He married Elizabeth Fea in 1931; they had a daughter Jennifer in 1934. He retired in 1966 and died in 1968.

References

1899 births
1968 deaths
People from Cheltenham
British metallurgists
Officers of the Order of the British Empire
Alumni of Magdalen College, Oxford
Isaac Wolfson Professors of Metallurgy
Fellows of St Edmund Hall, Oxford
Fellows of the Royal Society
English deaf people
Scientists with disabilities